The 2008–09 season was Juventus Football Club's 111th in existence and 2nd consecutive season in the top flight of Italian football.

Season review

At various points in the season, Juventus looked as though they could challenge rivals Internazionale's stronghold over Serie A, most notably in November 2008 following five successive wins, in late January 2009 after a seven-game unbeaten streak and again in March 2009 after another series of seven games without losing, which included impressive 4–1 successes over Bologna and Roma. Coach Claudio Ranieri, however, seemed to encounter serious problems in motivating his troops with his constant belittling of Juventus' title chances.

After a club record run of seven consecutive league games without a win in April and May, Ranieri was sacked in only his second season at Juventus. This barren run of results also included a 2–1 loss at home to Lazio in the Coppa Italia semi-finals, meaning the Turin side were once more denied the chance to compete for silverware. Juventus legend and former centre back Ciro Ferrara, who was the director of the Youth Sector at that time, was appointed the caretaker manager for the remaining two matches. The wins over Siena and Lazio ensured a second-place finish over AC Milan (based on head-to-head record) after the Rossoneri failed to take advantage of Juve's winless streak and lost 3–2 away at Roma.

In Europe, Juventus began brightly, going unbeaten in their six group games and topping their group. These positive performances saw the Italians beat Spanish champions Real Madrid both home and away. Alessandro Del Piero, who scored a brace at the Santiago Bernabéu just four days before celebrating his 34th birthday, earned himself a standing ovation from the notoriously hostile Madrid crowd.

The knockout stages were much less rejoicing for the Bianconeri. They were knocked out by English club Chelsea who had just changed their manager. Despite battling with ten men in the second leg, Juventus drew the game 2–2, meaning they were eliminated after the 1–0 loss in London.

On 5 June 2009, it was confirmed that Ferrara had been appointed as the full-time manager on a two-year contract.

Players

Squad information
As of 2 April 2009.

 (vice-captain)

 (captain)

Reserve squad

Youth squad

UEFA Champions League squad

Transfers

In

Out

Loaned out

Pre-season and friendlies

Goal scorers

Friendly matches

TIM Trophy 2008

Final tournament standings
3 points for win, 0 points for loss
2 points for penalty kick win, 1 point for penalty kick loss
Milan wins tournament based on head-to-head result

Scorers

Matches

Emirates Cup

Final tournament standings
3 points for win, 1 point for tie, 0 points for loss
1 point for every goal scored
each team played 2 games; Juventus did not play Real Madrid, Arsenal did not play Hamburg
Juventus finishes 3rd based on head-to-head result

Scorers

Matches

Trofeo Luigi Berlusconi

Trofeo Birra Moretti

Final tournament standings
3 points for win, 0 points for loss
2 points for penalty kick win, 1 point for penalty kick loss
Juventus wins tournament based on head-to-head result

Scorers

Matches

Trofeo Città di Messna

Competitions

Serie A

League table

Results summary

Results by round

Matches

Coppa Italia

UEFA Champions League

Third qualifying round

Group stage

Knockout phase

Round of 16

Statistics

Appearances and goals

|-
! colspan=14 style=background:#dcdcdc; text-align:center| Goalkeepers

|-
! colspan=14 style=background:#dcdcdc; text-align:center| Defenders

|-
! colspan=14 style=background:#dcdcdc; text-align:center| Midfielders

|-
! colspan=14 style=background:#dcdcdc; text-align:center| Forwards

|-
! colspan=14 style=background:#dcdcdc; text-align:center| Players transferred out during the season

Goalscorers

Disciplinary record
Disciplinary records for all competitive matches. Players with 1 card or more included only.

References

Juventus F.C. seasons
Juventus